Sarvestan County is in Fars province, Iran. The capital of the county is the city of Sarvestan. At the 2006 census, the region's population (as Sarvestan District of Shiraz County) was 34,452 in 8,308 households. The following census in 2011 counted 40,531 people in 10,579 households, by which time the district had been separated from the county to form Sarvestan County. At the 2016 census, the county's population was 38,114 in 11,653 households.

Administrative divisions

The population history and structural changes of Sarvestan County's administrative divisions over three consecutive censuses are shown in the following table. The latest census shows two districts, four rural districts, and two cities.

References

 

Counties of Fars Province